The Christmas Chronicles 2 (titled as The Christmas Chronicles Part Two in the film) is a 2020 American Christmas comedy film directed and produced by Chris Columbus, who wrote the screenplay with Matt Lieberman. A sequel to the 2018 film The Christmas Chronicles, it features Kurt Russell reprising his role as Santa Claus. Also reprising their roles are Goldie Hawn, Darby Camp, Judah Lewis, and Kimberly Williams-Paisley, with new cast members Julian Dennison, Jahzir Bruno, Tyrese Gibson, Sunny Suljic, Darlene Love, and Malcolm McDowell. The film had a limited theatrical release before moving to Netflix on November 25, 2020.

Plot
Two years after the events of the first film, Kate Pierce is now a cynical 13-year-old who is unhappy about spending Christmas in Cancún, Mexico with her mother Claire, her brother Teddy, Claire's new boyfriend Bob Booker, and Bob's son Jack. She wants to be back home, where it is snowing. Kate decides to run away and get an early flight back home to Boston. She catches a shuttle that Jack sneaks on to. They are unexpectedly transported, through a wormhole, to the North Pole by the driver, Belsnickel, a nefarious Christmas elf.

Kate and Jack are discovered and saved by Santa Claus, who brings them back to his house and Mrs. Claus. The Clauses give the kids a grand tour of their village and all it has to offer. The four of them go back to the house for dinner. Jack and Kate go to bed as Belsnickel and his follower Speck begin an attempt to destroy the village. Mrs. Claus tells the kids the origin story of Santa in Turkey and how he saved the elves from extinction, and received the Star of Bethlehem, a magical artifact that stops time in and provides power to Santa's Village. The Clauses adopted Belsnickel. As he grew up and they had less time for him, he became unruly, causing him to be transformed into a human as a curse, and ran away.

Belsnickel releases Jola, a yule cat, into the reindeer pen, critically injuring Dasher. Belsnickel releases a potion into the village that causes the elves to go insane. He steals the Star of Bethlehem on top of the village's Christmas tree. Santa and the others confront him. Santa attempts to take the star back and in the struggle between him and Belsnickel, it is accidentally destroyed, causing the power to go out in the village. The maddened elves start a snowball fight that allows Belsnickel to escape. Santa and Kate leave for Turkey in order to get the forest elves led by Hakan to build a new star. Jack leaves to get a root to cure the crazed elves while Mrs. Claus stays behind to tend to Dasher. Kate and Santa find the elves as Hakan (Malcolm McDowell) leads them into building a casing for a new star and Santa captures the power of the Star of Bethlehem inside it.

While flying back to the village, Belsnickel catches up to them on a sleigh pulled by his jackalotes (a hybrid of a jackal and a coyote) which he created, steals the star so he can stop himself from aging long enough to figure out how to replace Santa, and transports them back to 1990 Boston via a time-travel device he planted on Santa's sleigh. Jack finds the root and brings it back to Mrs Claus. Kate attempts to buy AAA batteries for Belsnickel's time travel device, which she and Santa now possess, at Boston airport to transport her and Santa back to the future. However, she is detained by airport security due to an apparent counterfeit (the money was marked 2020). Kate is taken to a locked security room with kids who have lost their parents. When Kate becomes upset about her wrongdoings at Cancun, another kid named Doug comforts Kate and helps her escape the room. After Kate joins Santa, she realizes Doug Pierce is her late father. With help from a worker named Grace, Santa gets everybody singing a Christmas song as the weather clears up. With Christmas spirit high enough for the sleigh to fly, Santa puts the batteries in and they transport back and recover the star.

Mrs. Claus makes the root into a powder. Jack fights his way to the snow cannons, places the powder inside, and shoots it onto the elves, curing them. Santa and Kate race back to the village evading Belsnickel as he chases them. Mrs. Claus throws an explosive gingerbread cookie in between both sleighs before they can collide in a game of chicken. Dasher recovers and assists Santa in defeating Jola, the latter hurling the yule cat out of the village. Kate places the star on top of the tree, restoring power to the village. Santa gives Belsnickel the first toy that they built together, and Belsnickel reconciles with them, transforming back into an elf.

Santa flies Kate and Jack back to Cancún where they inform an excited Teddy about their adventure. Kate also becomes more accepting of Bob. At the end of the day, Kate, her Mom, and Teddy, along with Bob and Jack sing "O' Christmas Tree" as Santa, Mrs. Claus, Belsnickel, and the elves sing the same song in the North Pole.

Cast
 Kurt Russell as Santa Claus / Saint "Nick" Nicholas, a magical figure who brings presents for people on Christmas night, when they are asleep.
 Goldie Hawn as Mrs Claus, the wife of Santa Claus.
 Darby Camp as Kate Pierce, a girl who previously helped Santa Claus in the last movie.
 Kimberly Williams-Paisley as Claire Pierce, a widowed nurse who is the mother of Kate and Teddy.
 Jahzir Bruno as Jack Booker, the son of Bob Booker.
 Julian Dennison as Belsnickel, an elf adopted by Santa Claus who goes rogue and ended up human. Dennison also voices his elf form.
 Tyrese Gibson as Bob Booker, Claire's new boyfriend.
 Judah Lewis as Teddy Pierce, the brother of Kate who no longer engages in malicious activities.
 Sunny Suljic as young Doug Pierce, the younger version of Kate and Teddy's late father who Kate encounters in 1990.
 Darlene Love as Grace, a Boston airport worker in 1990.
 Patrick Gallagher as a Massachusetts State Police Trooper in 1990 who detains Kate.

Voices
 Malcolm McDowell as Hakan, the leader of the forest elves in Turkey.
 Andrew Morgado as Hugg
 Debi Derryberry as Fleck, Speck
 Jessica Lowe as Mina
 Michael Yurchak as Bjorn
 Kari Wahlgren as Jojo

Production

Development
On May 14, 2020, a sequel titled The Christmas Chronicles 2 was announced to have begun post-production. Original director Clay Kaytis, who served as executive producer for the sequel, dropped out and was replaced by Chris Columbus, who produced the first film.

Casting
Kurt Russell, Goldie Hawn, Darby Camp, Kimberly Williams-Paisley and Judah Lewis were all confirmed to reprise their roles, while Julian Dennison and Jahzir Bruno joined the cast for the sequel.

Release

Streaming
The film was streamed on Netflix on November 25, 2020. The film also played in three cities (at about 32 Cinemark theaters) the week prior to its digital release, the first time Netflix allowed one of its films to be played in a chain theater.

The film was the most-watched item on the site in its debut weekend. Netflix later reported the film was watched by 61 million households over its first month.

Reception
The website's critics consensus reads: "While it's missing some of the magic of the original, The Christmas Chronicles 2 serves up a sweet second helping of holiday cheer that makes the most of its marvelously matched leads." On Metacritic, the film has a weighted average score of 51 out of 100 based on 12 critics, indicating "mixed or average reviews".

See also
 List of Christmas films
 Santa Claus in film

References

External links
 

1492 Pictures films
2020 comedy films
2020 films
2020s American films
2020s adventure comedy films
2020s Christmas comedy films
2020s English-language films
American adventure comedy films
American Christmas comedy films
American sequel films
Christmas adventure films
English-language Netflix original films
Films about time travel
Films directed by Chris Columbus
Films produced by Chris Columbus
Films set in 1990
Films set in 2020
Films set in airports
Films set in Boston
Films set in Mexico
Films scored by Christophe Beck
Films with screenplays by Chris Columbus
Films with screenplays by Matt Lieberman
Santa Claus in film